T.R.U.T.H. is the ninth studio album from Australian singer-songwriter Guy Sebastian. The album was confirmed on 14 July 2020 and was released on 16 October 2020.

Upon announcement, Sebastian said "I wanted to create something that was about my life, the things that I've been through and my truths. [...] More than anything I've learned the importance of having the right team around you, and what great things can be achieved when you do."

At the 2021 ARIA Music Awards, M-Phazes was nominated for Producer of the Year for work on this album.

Singles
"Before I Go" was released as the album's lead single on 2 November 2018 and peaked at number 41 on the ARIA singles chart and was certified Platinum in Australia and the Netherlands.

"Choir" was released on 31 May 2019 The song peaked at number 7 on the ARIA singles chart and was certified 3× Platinum in Australia. At the ARIA Music Awards of 2019, the song won Video of the Year and Song of the Year.

"Let Me Drink" was released on 15 November 2019 and features The HamilTones and Wale.

"Standing with You" was released on 26 June 2020. The song peaked at number 10 on the ARIA singles chart and was certified Gold in Australia.

"Love on Display" was released on 25 September 2020 as the album's fifth single.

"Only Thing Missing" was sent to radio on 26 February 2021 as the album's sixth single.

"Believer" was released on 20 August 2021 as the album's seventh single. The official music video premiered the same day.

Promotional singles
"If He Won't" was released on 11 September 2020, the same day the album became available for pre-order as the album's first promotional single.

Critical reception
Tyler Jenke of Tone Deaf said  "..with T.R.U.T.H. serving at Guy's ninth album, it sounds as though we're once again witnessing the start of something beautiful, with his soulful, powerful sound proving it is not only as mesmerising as ever, but that there is truly no stopping a stunning artist such as Guy Sebastian." While Alexander Pan, also from ToneDeaf, said "T.R.U.T.H., shows just why he is one of Australia's leading artists. We all know how good of a singer he is, yet Guy is still somehow improving on, well, everything as his soulful ninth studio album demonstrates how he just keeps getting better with each new release."
 
Broadway World said: "Although T.R.U.T.H. materialised in spurts - during various sessions with songwriters in different geographical locations across a two-and-a-half-year period - it's undeniably Sebastian's most cohesive-sounding album to date."

Commercial performance
On 21 October 2020, Australian Recording Industry Association (ARIA) announced in their mid-week report that the album was in contention to debut at number 1 on the ARIA Albums Chart. On 24 October 2020, T.R.U.T.H debuted at number one in Australia on the ARIA Albums Chart for the chart dated 26 October 2020. The album became his first number one album in seven years (his last being Armageddon in December 2012) and his third overall.

In New Zealand, the album debuted and peaked at number 39 on the New Zealand Top 40 Albums Chart for the chart dated 26 October 2020.

Track listing

Charts

Weekly charts

Year-end charts

Certifications

Release history

References

2020 albums
Guy Sebastian albums
Sony Music Australia albums